Tainted Love/Where Did Our Love Go was an EP by the synthpop/new wave duo group Soft Cell.

Track listing

External links
Soft Cell Discography (exhaustive) 

Soft Cell albums
1981 EPs
Sire Records EPs